This is a list of episodes of the South Korean variety-music show King of Mask Singer in 2022. The show airs on MBC as part of their Sunday Night lineup. Due to the COVID-19 pandemic, the show would be recorded without any audience in the episodes, and the matches' results would be decided by the celebrity panelists. As of the 178th Generation on May 29, 2022, the live audience returned similar to before the pandemic. The names listed below are in performance order.

 – Contestant is instantly eliminated by the live audience and judging panel
 – After being eliminated, contestant performs a prepared song for the next round and takes off their mask during the instrumental break
 – After being eliminated and revealing their identity, contestant has another special performance.
 – Contestant advances to the next round.
 – Contestant becomes the challenger.
 – Mask King.

Episodes

168th Generation Mask King (cont.)

Episode 338 was broadcast on January 2, 2022.

169th Generation Mask King

Contestants: Kang Joo-won (Pinocchio), Park Jae-jin, Lee Jang-kun,  (Jewelry), Kota (Sunny Hill), Hickee, Daeyeol (Golden Child), 

Episode 339

Episode 339 was broadcast on January 9, 2022. This marks the beginning of the Hundred-sixty-ninth Generation.

Episode 340

Episode 340 was broadcast on January 16, 2022.

170th Generation Mask King

Contestants: , Yang Hee-seung, Eunha (Viviz),  (Hpresso), Park Hyun-soo

Episode 341

Episode 341 was broadcast on January 23, 2022. This marks the beginning of the Hundred-seventieth Generation.

Episode 342

Episode 342 was broadcast on January 30, 2022.

171st Generation Mask King

Episode 343

Episode 343 was broadcast on February 6, 2022. This marks the beginning of the Hundred-seventy-first Generation.

Episode 344

Episode 344 was broadcast on February 20, 2022.

172nd Generation Mask King

Contestants: Minhee (Cravity), Kogyeol (Up10tion), Jung Yoo-kyung, Jeong Ga-eun, Huh Chan-mi, Kang Joon-woo (Yook Joong-wan's band), 

Episode 345

Episode 345 was broadcast on February 27, 2022. This marks the beginning of the Hundred-seventy-second Generation.

Episode 346

Episode 346 was broadcast on March 6, 2022.

173rd Generation Mask King

Contestants: Jundoy, Park Kyung-hwan, Yoo Hee-kwan, Jihan (Weeekly), Michelle Lee, Ri.hey (CocaNButter)

Episode 347

Episode 347 was broadcast on March 13, 2022. This marks the beginning of the Hundred-seventy-third Generation.

Episode 348

Episode 348 was broadcast on March 20, 2022.

174th Generation Mask King

Contestants: Ida Daussy, Park Dae-bong (The Virile Sons), Gabee (LACHICA), Kim Yoo-ha, Kim Bo-reum, Min

Episode 349

Episode 349 was broadcast on March 27, 2022. This marks the beginning of the Hundred-seventy-fourth Generation.

Episode 350

Episode 350 was broadcast on April 3, 2022.

175th Generation Mask King

Contestants: Kim Joo-hee, Jaegal Sung-yeol, Kwon Eun-bi, Myunghan (High4), Jeong Hong-il

Episode 351

Episode 351 was broadcast on April 10, 2022. This marks the beginning of the Hundred-seventy-fifth Generation.

Episode 352

Episode 352 was broadcast on April 17, 2022.

176th Generation Mask King

Contestants: Ace (Paran), Shin Min-cheol (T-max), Soyeon ((G)I-dle), Do Dae-yoon (Togeworl)

Episode 353

Episode 353 was broadcast on May 1, 2022. This marks the beginning of the Hundred-seventy-sixth Generation.

Episode 354

Episode 354 was broadcast on May 8, 2022.

177th Generation Mask King

K (2PM), 

Episode 355

Episode 355 was broadcast on May 15, 2022. This marks the beginning of the Hundred-seventy-seventh Generation.

Episode 356

Episode 356 will be broadcast on May 22, 2022.

178th Generation Mask King
Contestants: You Young, Sung Ah, Taeyang (SF9), Shin Hyun-hee (Seenroot), Sunwoo Yong-nyeo, Charles

Episode 357
Episode 357 was broadcast on May 29, 2022. This marks the Hundred seventy-eighth Generation.

Episode 358
Episode 358 was broadcast on June 5, 2022.

179th Generation Mask King

Episode 359
Episode 359 was broadcast on June 12, 2022. This marks the Hundred seventy-ninth Generation. 

Episode 360
Episode 360 was broadcast on June 19, 2022.

180th Generation Mask King
Contestants: Swan (Purple Kiss), Song I-han, Park Seung-hi, Kim Su-hyeon, Lee Man-bok, 

Episode 361 
Episode 361 was broadcast on June 26, 2022. This marks the Hundred eightieth Generation.

Episode 362
Episode 362 was broadcast on July 3, 2022.

181st Generation Mask King
Contestants: Ralral, Cha Jun-ho (Drippin), You Chae-hoon of La Poem, Ji Hyun-woo, Kim Ye-ji of KARDI

Episode 363
Episode 363 was broadcast on July 10, 2022.

Episode 364 
Episode 364 was broadcast on July 17, 2022.

182nd Generation Mask King
Contestants: , Kim Jung-ah of After School, Kim Sae-rom, Ha Sung-woon of Wanna One/Hotshot

Episode 365
Episode 365 was broadcast on July 24, 2022. 

Episode 366
Episode 366 was broadcast on July 31, 2022.

183rd Generation Mask King
Contestants: Haeyoon (Cherry Bullet), Kim Hye-jung of Seabird, Alan Kim, Lee Sung-wook (R.ef), Shin Gi-ru, Ryan S. Jhun, Geegooin (Rhythm Power)

Episode 367 
Episode 367 was broadcast on August 7, 2022.

Episode 368
Episode 368 was broadcast on August 14, 2022.

184th Generation Mask King
Contestants: , Im Hyuk, Jongho (Ateez), Choi Ye-geun, Yang Sang-guk, Big Naughty, 

Episode 369
Episode 369 was broadcast on August 21, 2022.

Episode 370
Episode 370 was broadcast on August 28, 2022.

2022 Chuseok Special: 2nd Generation Duet Mask Kings

Contestants: Bae Seung-min of (Golden Child) & Kogyeol of (Up10tion),  & Shim Hyung-rae,  & , Park Hyun-soo of  & Baek Hyung-hoon of (Hpresso),  & , Kota of (Sunny Hill) & Hickee,  of  &  of (V.O.S),  of (Flower) &  of (Yuk Joong-wan Band)

Episode 371
Episode 371 was broadcast on September 4, 2022. Winner of the special episodes ("Our Friendship Is Within One Vote") revealed their identities through a special performance on the beginning of the 185th Generation Mask King. Pairs 3 and 4 of Round 1 were switched during broadcast.

Episode 372
Episode 372 was broadcast on September 11, 2022.

Episode 373
Episode 373 was broadcast on September 18, 2022.

185th Generation Mask King

Episode 373 was broadcast on September 18, 2022.

Episode 374
Episode 374 was broadcast on September 25, 2022.

Episode 375
Episode 375 was broadcast on October 2, 2022.

186th Generation Mask King

Episode 376
Episode 376 was broadcast on October 9, 2022.

Episode 377
Episode 377 was broadcast on October 16, 2022.

187th Generation Mask King
Contestants: Yoon Chae-won (Classy), Yeji, Tsuki (Billlie), Park Min-ha, Seomoon Tak, 

Episode 378
Episode 378 was broadcast on October 23, 2022.

Episode 379
Episode 379 was broadcast on November 6, 2022. It was originally scheduled to air on October 30.

188th Generation Mask King
Contestants: Lily of (Nmixx), Wetboy, Ricky Kim, Kino of (Pentagon), 

Episode 380
Episode 380 was broadcast on November 13, 2022.

Episode 381

Episode 381 was broadcast on November 20, 2022.

189th Generation Mask King
Contestants: Yoon of (STAYC), Ahn So-young, Wonstein, Lee Jae-won of (H.O.T.)

Episode 382
Episode 382 was broadcast on December 4, 2022, skipping a week due to streaming the 2022 FIFA World Cup.

Episode 383

Episode 383 was broadcast on December 11, 2022.

190th Generation Mask King
Contestants:  of (Lucy), Hong Shin-ae, Jaeyoon of (TO1), Miryo of (Brown Eyed Girls), Lee Young-yoo, Kim Hyung-il, 

Episode 384
Episode 384 was broadcast on December 18, 2022.

Episode 385

Episode 385 will be broadcast on December 25, 2022.

References 

Lists of King of Mask Singer episodes
Lists of variety television series episodes
Lists of South Korean television series episodes
2022 in South Korean television